Suresh is an Indian masculine given name originating in the Sanskrit word  (compound of  and ). Its meaning is "Ruler of Gods" and it has been used an epithet for the Hindu gods Indra, Brahma, Vishnu and Shiva.

People named Suresh include:

Suresh (actor), Indian actor in Telugu and Tamil films
Suresh (director), Tamil film director
Suresh Balaje, Indian film producer
Suresh Bharadwaj, Indian politician
Suresh Gopi (born 1960), Indian Malayalam film actor
Suresh Heblikar, Indian Kannada film actor
Suresh Joachim, Tamil Canadian film actor, producer and multiple Guinness World Record holder
Suresh Joshi, Indian poet, writer and literary critic
Suresh Krishna, Indian Malayali film actor
Suresh Krissna, Indian Tamil film director
Suresh Kumar (government official), American economist and businessman, Director-General of the U.S. Foreign Commercial Service
Suresh Oberoi, Indian Hindi movie actor
Suresh Pachouri, Indian politician
Suresh Raina, Indian cricketer
Suresh Premachandran, Sri Lankan Tamil politician and leader of the Eelam People's Revolutionary Liberation Front
Suresh Venkatasubramanian, Indian-American computer scientist
D. Suresh Babu, Indian Telugu film producer
J. Suresh, Tamil film director
Subra Suresh, engineer and scientist, president of Nanyang Technological University
Mohinder Suresh, fictional character in the television series "Heroes"

See also
 Suresh v. Canada (Minister of Citizenship and Immigration) – a leading case of the Supreme Court of Canada

References

Indian masculine given names
Tamil masculine given names